The 1958 Mailuu-Suu tailings dam failure in the industrial town of Mailuu-Suu, (Kyrgyz: Майлуусуу), Jalal-Abad Region, southern Kyrgyzstan, caused the uncontrolled release of  of radioactive waste.  

The event caused several direct casualties and widespread environmental damage.  It was the single worst incident in a region of arid, mountainous western Kyrgyzstan, with a collection of shuttered Soviet-era uranium mining and processing sites, a legacy of extensive radioactive waste dumps, and a history of flooding and mudslides.

As of 2017, despite recent remediations funded by the World Bank and others, the treatment of radioactive waste at Mailuu-Suu still poses serious health and safety risks for local residents.

Background 

Oil was discovered here in the early 1900s. Deposits of radium-bearing barites had been discovered by Alexander Fersman in 1929, during his national mineralogical resources survey for the new Soviet government. Uranium mining began in 1946, organized by the "Zapadnyi Mining and Chemical Combine". The processed ore was both mined locally and imported from elsewhere in the Eastern Bloc. 

The town was classified as one of the Soviet government's secret cities, officially known only as "Mailbox 200".

Uranium mining was halted in 1968.  Operations left behind some 23 separate uranium tailings dams and 13 waste rock dumps, poorly designed on unstable hillsides above a town of 20,000 people in an area prone to both landslides and earthquakes, holding a total  of material containing radionuclides and heavy metals. No attempt to stabilize or seal the material was done when Soviet mining ceased.

Dam failure 

On April 16, 1958, with mining and processing plants still operational, a combination of poor design, neglect, heavy rainfall and a reported earthquake caused the #7 tailings dam at Mailuu-Suu to fail. About 50% of the entire volume of the dam flowed into the swift Mailuu-Suu River, only  downhill from the breach. The Mailuu-Suu River is a tributary of the Kara Darya, used for agricultural irrigation in the valley.  

Some fatalities, building destruction, and contamination of the flood plain were reported as the direct result of the mudflow.  Lack of any public response by officials makes it difficult to identify fatalities from the April 1958 event, especially as distinguished from everyday exposure.

Aftermath  

Longterm health effects are more measurable.  Grave threats to long-term residents persist, with residents experiencing far higher rates of cancer, goiter, anemia, and other illnesses related to radiological exposure.

Mailuu-Suu was found to be one of the 10 most polluted sites in the world in a study published in 2006 by the Blacksmith Institute.

Annual spring flooding and the lack of maintenance pose a continued threat of further releases of radioactive material.  In 1994, a new landslide temporarily dammed the Mailuu-Suu River.  In 2002 a flood caused by a mudslide nearly submerged a tailings pit. 

The World Bank approved a US$5 million grant to reclaim the tailings pits in 2004, and approved an additional $1 million grant for the project in 2011. The United Nations Development Programme, and the European Bank for Reconstruction and Development have also funded programs.

References 

Tailings dam failures
Radioactively contaminated areas
Radiation accidents and incidents
1958 mining disasters
Mining in Kyrgyzstan
1958 in the Soviet Union
Disasters in the Soviet Union 
1958 disasters in the Soviet Union
Dam failures in Asia